Loves Park is a city in Boone and Winnebago counties in the U.S. state of Illinois. Most of the city is in Winnebago County, with a tiny sliver in the east located in Boone County. The population was 23,996 at the 2010 census, up from 20,044 in 2000.

Loves Park is part of the Rockford Metropolitan Statistical Area.

History
Malcolm Love, an industrialist in Rockford, Illinois, purchased 236 acres of land in this area in 1901 and set up a gathering place that came to be known as Love's Park.
When the city's economy was negatively affected by the early 1980s recession, City Hall was moved from the Grand Avenue fire station into the Marshall Middle School to save money. In 2001, Danfoss moved their plant from Rockford to Loves Park, becoming one of the town's largest employers.

Geography

Loves Park is located at  (42.326227, -89.025739).

Demographics

At the 2000 census there were 20,044 people, 8,144 households, and 5,399 families living in the city. The racial makeup of the city was 92.89% White, 2.33% African American, 0.21% Native American, 1.81% Asian, 0.02% Pacific Islander, 1.13% from other races, and 1.60% from two or more races. Hispanic or Latino of any race were 3.27%.

Of the 8,144 households 33.5% had children under the age of 18 living with them, 51.6% were married couples living together, 10.2% had a female householder with no husband present, and 33.7% were non-families; 27.3% of households were one person and 9.6% were one person aged 65 or older. The average household size was 2.44 and the average family size was 2.99.

The age distribution was 26.2% under the age of 18, 8.0% from 18 to 24, 33.7% from 25 to 44, 20.8% from 45 to 64, and 11.3% 65 or older. The median age was 35 years. For every 100 females, there were 95.9 males. For every 100 females age 18 and over, there were 92.7 males.

The median household income was $45,238 and the median family income  was $52,061. Males had a median income of $38,167 versus $25,771 for females. The per capita income for the city was $20,781. About 3.7% of families and 5.0% of the population were below the poverty line, including 5.0% of those under age 18 and 3.5% of those age 65 or over.

Notable people
Dick Kulpa, cartoonist
Robin Zander, lead singer of the rock band Cheap Trick.

References

External links
 City of Loves Park official website

Cities in Winnebago County, Illinois
Cities in Boone County, Illinois
Cities in Illinois
1947 establishments in Illinois